Ben Moore is an English professor of astrophysics, author, musician, and director of the Center for Theoretical Astrophysics and Cosmology at the University of Zürich. His research is focussed on cosmology, gravity, astroparticle physics, and planet formation. He has authored in excess of 200 scientific papers on the origin of planets and galaxies, as well as dark matter and dark energy. In his research, he simulates the universe using custom-built supercomputers.

Biography 
Moore gained his PhD from Durham University in 1991, and then spent several years as a research associate at the University of California, Berkeley and at the University of Washington, Seattle.

Research 
Moore and collaborators identified the cuspy halo problem and dwarf galaxy problem that persist in the cold dark matter paradigm. He also formulated a new mechanism for the origin of dwarf galaxies in clusters named galaxy harassment. Using numerical simulations he determined that Earth-Moon planetary systems are not rare.
Moore and collaborators predicted that the first structures to form in the Universe were Earth-sized dark matter haloes which collapsed just 20 million years after the Big Bang.

Books 
He has written popular science books for adults and children, including: 
 "Sternenstaub. Die Geschichte des Universums in 42 nie verliehenen Nobelpreisen"
 "Moon: Past, Present & Future"
 "Mond - eine Biografie"
 "Gibt es auf der dunklen Seite vom Mond Aliens?"
 "Elefanten im All"
 "Elephants in Space - The Past, the Present and Future of Life and the Universe"
 "Da draussen – Leben auf unserem Planeten und anderswo" (Out there, life on our planets and elsewhere) was also translated from German into Dutch ('Hallo daar! De zoektocht naar leven elders in het universum').

Music 
Under his artist name ‘Professor Moore’, he creates electro-rock music. He plays the guitar with the electro-rock band Milk67 and featured together with them in a float at the 2010 Zurich Street Parade. In 2014 he released a solo album called "Escape Velocity".

Selected publications

References 

Year of birth missing (living people)
Living people
Academic staff of the University of Zurich
British astrophysicists
English expatriates in Switzerland
Alumni of Durham University